Riven Rock is a residential subdivision in the unincorporated area of Montecito, California (near Santa Barbara, California). The Riven Rock subdivision is located on the former Riven Rock Estate.

The Riven Rock Estate was owned by the McCormick family, who purchased the 84 acre property in 1896 and in 1898 built a large two-story Mission Revival home on the premises. The estate's name came from an oak tree near the main gate, which was growing out of and had split a large boulder. It was where Stanley McCormick, the youngest child of Cyrus Hall McCormick and Nancy Fowler McCormick, and husband of Katharine McCormick, was confined for much of his life as he suffered from schizophrenia.

After the 1925 Santa Barbara earthquake the main house was demolished. After Stanley McCormick's death in 1947, Katharine sold the estate in 1949 to one real estate developer, who sold it to another developer in 1950.  The second one subdivided the estate into 34 smaller parcels and put them up for sale. 

Stanely McCormick's life was the basis of T.C. Boyle's 1998 novel Riven Rock.

In 2020, Meghan, Duchess of Sussex and Prince Harry, Duke of Sussex, after deciding to withdraw from royal family duties, purchased the French Provençal "Chateau of Riven Rock", which is located on the grounds of the old Riven Rock Estate. The seven-acre, 18,671-square-foot residence was purchased from the Russian oligarch Sergey Grishin for $14.6 million.

References

External links

 Riven Rock Estate Map created for Rivenrock Historical Estate community association in Montecito, California

Houses in California
Royal residences in the United States
Prince Harry, Duke of Sussex
Meghan, Duchess of Sussex
Montecito, California